Mauro Trari (born 6 October 2000) is a Belgian professional footballer who plays as a forward for Challenger Pro League club Beveren.

References 

2000 births
Living people
Belgian footballers
Association football forwards
S.K. Beveren players
Challenger Pro League players